A savant is someone with savant syndrome.

Savant may also refer to:

Places
 Côte de Savant, the Chablis region of Burgundy, France
 Savant Lake, a place in Ontario, Canada

People
 Savant (musician) (born 1987), Norwegian musician
 Doug Savant (born 1964), American actor
 Marilyn vos Savant (born 1946), American author
 Savant Young (born 1976), American professional mixed martial artist

Arts, entertainment, and media 
 Savant (DC Comics), a comic book character
 Savant (Wildstorm), a comic book character 
 Savant, a 1993 novel by James Follett

Brands and enterprises
 Savant Investment Group, an American wealth management company
 Savant publications, an American not-for-profit magazine publisher

See also 

 Prodigy (disambiguation)